Theobroma grandiflorum, commonly known as cupuaçu, also spelled cupuassu, cupuazú, cupu assu, or copoazu, is a tropical rainforest tree related to cacao. The pulp of the cupuaçu fruit is consumed throughout Central and South America, especially in the northern states of Brazil, and is used to make ice creams, snack bars, and other products.

Description 

As they mature, the leaves change from pink-tinted to green, and eventually they begin bearing fruit.

Flowers of cupuaçu are structurally complex, and require pollination from biotic vectors. The majority of cupuaçu trees are self-incompatible, which can result in decreased pollination levels, and consequently, a decrease in fruit yields. Pollination can also be negatively affected by environmental conditions. Pollinators, which include chrysomelid weevils and stingless bees, are unable to fly between flowers in heavy rains.

The white pulp of the cupuaçu has an odour described as a mix of chocolate and pineapple and is frequently used in desserts, juices and sweets. The juice tastes primarily like pear, banana, passion fruit, and melon. Chocolate made from cupuaçu, very similar to that made from cocoa, is called cupulate.

Cultivation 

Cupuaçu is most commonly propagated from seed, but grafting and rooted cuttings are also used.

Cupuaçu trees are often incorporated in agroforestry systems throughout the Amazon due to their high tolerance of infertile soils, which are predominate in the Amazon region.

Cupuaçu is generally harvested from the ground once they have naturally fallen from the tree. It can be difficult to determine peak ripeness because there is no noticeable external color change in the fruit. However studies have shown that in Western Colombian Amazon conditions, fruits generally reach full maturity within 117 days after fruit set. Brazilians either eat it raw or use it in making sweets.

Commercial food products include pulp and powder.

Pests and diseases 
Witches’ broom (Moniliophthora perniciosa) is the most prominent disease that affects cupuaçu trees. It affects the entire tree and can result in significant loss of yields, as well as tree death if left untreated. Regular pruning is recommended to reduce the severity of this disease in cupuaçu plantings.

Cupuaçu supports the butterfly herbivore, "lagarta verde", Macrosoma tipulata (Hedylidae), which can be a defoliator.

Phytochemicals 
Cupuaçu flavors derive from its phytochemicals, such as tannins, glycosides, theograndins, catechins, quercetin, kaempferol and isoscutellarein. It also contains theacrine, caffeine, theobromine, and theophylline as found in cacao, although with a much lower amount of caffeine.

Cupuaçu butter

Cupuaçu butter is a triglyceride composed of saturated and unsaturated fatty acids, giving the butter a low melting point (approximately 30 °C) and texture of a soft solid, lending its use as a confectionery resembling white chocolate. Main fatty acid components of cupuaçu butter are stearic acid (38%), oleic acid (38%), palmitic acid (11%) and arachidic acid (7%).

See also 
 Theobroma bicolor
 Amazonian cuisine

References

External links

grandiflorum
Trees of Brazil
Crops originating from South America
Tropical fruit